The International Racquetball Federation's 20th Racquetball World Championships was held in Guatemala City, Guatemala from November 29-December 6, 2021. The event was to be held in the summer of 2020, but the COVID-19 pandemic led to the postponement of the event.

The 2021 World Racquetball Championships were the racquetball qualifying event for the 2022 World Games.

The defending champions were Rodrigo Montoya of Mexico in Men's Singles, Gabriela Martinez of Guatemala in Women's Singles, Mexicans Alvaro Beltran and Daniel De La Rosa in Men's Doubles, and Bolivians Valeria Centellas and Yasmine Sabja in Women's Doubles. Mexico swept the team standings, topping the Men's, Women's and Overall standings.

Tournament format
The 2021 World Championships used a two-stage format to determine the World Champions. Initially, players competed in separate groups over three days. The results were used to seed players for an elimination round. Thus, there was no team competition. Team standings were based on points earned from the singles and doubles competitions.

Medal table

Events

Men's singles

Women's singles

Men's doubles

Women's doubles

Team Standings

Men's Teams

Women's Teams

Overall Team Standings

2022 World Games Qualifiers

Men

Women

References

External links
IRF website

Racquetball World Championships
International sports competitions hosted by Guatemala
Racquetball
Racquetball World Championships
Sports competitions in Guatemala City
Racquetball